Moshchena is a village in Kovel Raion, Volyn Oblast, Ukraine. It has a population of 581 people.

The first mention of the village dates from 1543.

References 

Villages in Kovel Raion